Senecio thapsoides DC. is a plant in the aster family (Asteraceae). The species was formerly placed in subgenus Cineraria and is sometimes found as Cineraria thapsoides. Cineraria however is now almost entirely limited to Southern Africa. The species was first named by Augustin Pyramus de Candolle in 1838. It is recognized in Flora europaea with two subspecies: thapsoides and S. t. visianianus.

References

Flora of Bosnia and Herzegovina
Flora of North Macedonia
Flora of Greece
Flora of Europe
thapsoides